Owmal (also Romanized as Owmāl and Ūmāl) is a village in Peyrajeh Rural District, in the Central District of Neka County, Mazandaran Province, Iran. At the 2006 census, its population was 950, in 251 families.

References 

Populated places in Neka County